Mauril Adrien Jules Bélanger  (June 15, 1955 – August 15, 2016) was a Canadian politician.

A member of the Liberal Party of Canada, he represented Ottawa—Vanier in the House of Commons through a by-election victory in 1995 until his death in 2016. Bélanger also served in cabinet during the premiership of Paul Martin as Minister responsible for Official Languages, Associate Minister of National Defence, Minister responsible for Democratic Reform, and Minister for Internal Trade.

He was considered a frontrunner for the position of Speaker of the House of Commons after his 8th electoral victory during the 2015 federal election, but withdrew after being diagnosed with amyotrophic lateral sclerosis, which caused his death in 2016.

Early life 
Bélanger was born the second of five children in Mattawa, Ontario, a small logging town in northeastern Ontario where the Mattawa and Ottawa Rivers meet. He graduated from the University of Ottawa in 1977, where he had served as President of the Student Federation. In the early 1980s, he worked for Jean-Luc Pépin, then Minister of Transport. In the mid to late 1980s, he worked as a registered investment advisor. He was then the Chief of Staff to Peter Clark (Chair of the Regional Council of Ottawa-Carleton).

Politics 
Bélanger was first elected to Parliament on February 13, 1995, in a by-election in the riding of Ottawa—Vanier, which has a large Francophone population. His predecessor, Jean-Robert Gauthier, was appointed to the Senate. Ottawa–Vanier is considered a solid Liberal riding, having returned a Liberal MP since its creation in 1935, usually in a landslide. Bélanger himself won by large margins in the 1997, 2000, 2004, 2006, and 2008 elections. He won re-election for a seventh term by a reduced margin with 38.2% of the vote in the May 2011 election.  In the October 2015 election, Bélanger had his largest margin since the 1997 election.

Chrétien and Martin years 
As member of Parliament, Bélanger served as Chair of the Standing Committee on Official Languages, member of the Standing Committee on the Library of Parliament and member of the Prime Minister's Task Force on Urban Issues. From July 1998 to August 2000, he was Parliamentary Secretary to the Minister of Canadian Heritage. In December 2003, he was appointed Deputy Leader of the Government in the House of Commons and Chief Government Whip.

In the government of Paul Martin, Bélanger served as Minister responsible for Official Languages, Associate Minister of National Defence, Minister responsible for Democratic Reform, and Minister for Internal Trade.

Opposition 
Bélanger was re-elected in the 2006 federal election, and served as the Official Opposition critic for Canadian Heritage from February 2006 to January 2007, when he began a nine-month stint as critic for Infrastructure and Communities under new Liberal leader Stéphane Dion. From October 2007 to March 2008, Bélanger served as the Official Opposition critic for Official Languages, Canadian Heritage, and the Francophonie. After Bélanger won his seat once more in the 2008 federal election, he was appointed as Official Opposition critic for Official Languages in March 2010 by Liberal leader Michael Ignatieff. After Bélanger's re-election in the 2011 federal election, he continued as his party's critic on this file under interim leader Bob Rae until May 2012. After Justin Trudeau's election as Liberal leader, Bélanger was appointed the party's critic for Cooperatives in August 2013.

Return to government 
Following his re-election in the 2015 federal election, Bélanger submitted his name for the position of Speaker of the House of Commons and was considered a front-runner for the post. However, on November 30, Bélanger announced that he was withdrawing as a candidate for speaker after he received a diagnosis of amyotrophic lateral sclerosis (ALS). Despite his diagnosis, Bélanger continued as MP for Ottawa—Vanier.

In December 2015, fellow Ottawa-area Liberal MP Andrew Leslie presented a motion in the house to name Bélanger honorary Speaker of the House of Commons and the right to sit in the chair for a future day. In January 2016, Bélanger became the first MP to use a voice generator in the House of Commons when he used an app on his tablet to introduce a private member's bill to amend to lyrics of "O Canada" to make them gender-neutral, which he had failed to do through a similar bill in the last parliament by a 144–127 vote. On March 9, 2016, Bélanger sat in the Speaker's chair for one day, and presided over the proceedings with the aid of an iPad app that produced a computerized voice. This honour made Bélanger the first honorary speaker of the house for a day.

On May 6, 2016, consideration of Bélanger's bill to make the national anthem gender neutral was blocked when Conservative MPs used up the hour of debate time and refused consent to two motions backed by both the Liberals and the NDP to extend debate and allow time to hold a vote to send the bill to committee. As Bélanger's health was deteriorating, Liberal MP Greg Fergus described the Conservative's procedural delay tactics as an attempt to prevent Bélanger from seeing the bill passed, while Conservative MPs insisted that they were debating an important issue and had followed parliamentary procedure. Fellow Liberal MP Linda Lapointe gave up her timeslot for private member's business on May 30 to allow Bélanger's bill to be heard and go to a vote for it to be sent to committee the following day. In June 2016, the bill passed its third reading with a vote of 225 to 74 in the House of Commons. In July 2017, the bill was in its third, and final, reading in the Senate; the bill was passed on January 31, 2018 and received royal assent on February 7, 2018 to change "in all thy sons command" to "in all of us command", after Bélanger had already died.

Positions
Bélanger earned recognition for his promotion of francophone rights. In 2012, Bélanger asked the House of Commons to create a committee to examine the role of co-ops in the Canadian economy. This motion was unanimously passed by the House of Commons. He presided over the Canadian House of Commons for one day as an honorary Speaker on March 9, 2016, a job he aspired to before his diagnosis with amyotrophic lateral sclerosis (ALS). Later that year, Bélanger became the National Honorary Spokesperson for the ALS Societies' Across Canada WALK for ALS.

Honours
He was given the title of Commandeur de Ordre de la Pléiade, a francophone order which focuses on contributions made to international friendship and cooperation, in 2005. In 2007, László Sólyom, President of Hungary, made him an Officer of the Order of Merit of the Republic of Hungary. In April 2009, the Royal Canadian Legion recognized Bélanger for his contribution to the promotion of goodwill. In June 2016, Bélanger received the CHF Canada Award for Outstanding Contribution to Co-operative Housing for effecting positive, large scale change to the co-op housing sector. It was also published within the Canada Gazette of 30 July 2016 that he was awarded with the Grand Cross of the National Order of Honour and Merit, Silver Plaque of the Republic of Haiti.

Death
Bélanger died at age 61 of amyotrophic lateral sclerosis on August 15, 2016. He was survived by his wife, Catherine. He was succeeded in the by-election by Mona Fortier.

Electoral record
Source, unless otherwise stated:

|align="left" colspan=2|Liberal hold
|align="right"|Swing
|align="right"|+2.64
|align="right"|
|align="right"|

|align="left" colspan=2|Liberal hold
|align="right"|Swing
|align="right"| -5.67
|align="right"|

Archives 
There is a Mauril Bélanger fonds at Library and Archives Canada.

References

External links
 Official website
 

1955 births
2016 deaths
Franco-Ontarian people
Liberal Party of Canada MPs
Members of the 27th Canadian Ministry
Members of the House of Commons of Canada from Ontario
Members of the King's Privy Council for Canada
People from Mattawa, Ontario
Neurological disease deaths in Ontario
Deaths from motor neuron disease
Politicians from Ottawa
University of Ottawa alumni